Genesis 1970–1975 is a box set of five studio albums by Genesis featuring Peter Gabriel. It was released on 10 November 2008 in Europe by EMI and on 11 November 2008 in North America by Atlantic/Rhino. The 7-CD/6-DVD box set includes newly remixed versions of the albums Trespass, Nursery Cryme, Foxtrot, Selling England by the Pound and The Lamb Lies Down on Broadway. The band's 1969 debut album, From Genesis to Revelation, was excluded because of the band losing the rights to it. The fifth pair of discs includes B-side songs, 3 rare songs from BBC Sessions in 1970 and the never-before-released Genesis Plays Jackson soundtrack. Each bonus DVD features audio versions of the albums in 5.1 surround sound, as well as videos from each album's corresponding tour, new interviews, and photo galleries. The European version includes CD/SACD Hybrids instead of standard CDs.  EMI also released a limited edition six disc vinyl box set containing the original albums only on 24 November 2008.

Genesis 1970–1975 appeared at position seven in the "Top 100 Recommended CD Reviews of All Time" at All About Jazz. It has since fallen to position nine. In 2010 the box set received a Grammy Award nomination for Best Surround Sound Album.

Audio formats
In the European and Japanese releases of this box set, the CDs are hybrid SACD/CDs. The SACD layer is a multichannel surround sound remix.

In the Canadian and U.S. releases of this box set, standard CDs with no SACD layer are included.

In all versions of the box set, the DVDs are DVD-Video format (not DVD-Audio), although they contain both audio and video tracks. These DVDs include three audio mixes:  DTS 5.1-channel surround sound, Dolby Digital 5.1-channel surround sound, and Dolby Digital stereo. The DTS surround sound is a slightly compressed version of the surround sound on the SACDs (remark: Nick Davis talks about the DTS format and therefore means data compression/reduction, not compression of the dynamic range of the music), and the Dolby surround sound is a slightly inferior quality to the DTS.

All of the audio tracks on these CDs were remixed in stereo and surround sound by producer Nick Davis.

In addition to the 7-CD/6-DVD box set, EMI released a limited edition vinyl box set on 24 November 2008.

Track listing

Trespass & tracks 2-10 of Extra Tracks 1970-1975 written by: Phillips/Rutherford/Gabriel/Banks

All other tracks written by: Banks/Rutherford/Gabriel/Collins/Hackett

Trespass

CD

DVD

Nursery Cryme

CD

DVD

Foxtrot

CD

DVD

Selling England by the Pound

CD

DVD

The Lamb Lies Down on Broadway

CD

Disc 1

DVD

Disc 2

Extra Tracks 1970 to 1975

CD

{{smalldiv|1=
 The booklet lists "Going Out To Get You" as track 6. It is actually track 3. This page lists the tracks in the correct order.
 The first half of "Provocation" would be used two years later as the fanfare/verse of "The Fountain of Salmacis", while its second half was soon appropriated for the instrumental breakdown of Trespass "Looking for Someone".
 "Frustration" is largely based around a Tony Banks piano theme that would only reappear four years down the road as "Anyway" on The Lamb Lies Down on Broadway, though it also incorporates a fragment of the unreleased early song "Hair on the Arms and Legs," otherwise only available as a demo on the Genesis Archive 1967–75 boxed set.
 "Manipulation" is primarily composed of several instrumental fragments that would later be assembled into "The Musical Box" for Nursery Cryme.
 "Resignation" is the only track that lacks an obvious connection to any later Genesis song, though its chord changes are at times reminiscent of the already-released "In Hiding" (from From Genesis to Revelation), the instrumental section of "Stagnation" (from Trespass), and "The Musical Box."
}}DVD'''

Personnel
On all tracks:
 Tony Banks – keyboards, guitar, background vocals, second lead vocal on "Shepherd"
 Mike Rutherford – guitars, bass, bass pedals, cello, background vocals
 Peter Gabriel – lead vocals, flute, bass drum, oboe, tambourine

On Trespass, and tracks 3–10 of Extra Tracks:
Anthony Phillips – guitar, backing vocals, second lead vocal on "Let Us Now Make Love"
John Mayhew – drums, percussion, backing vocals

On Nursery Cryme, Foxtrot, Selling England by the Pound, The Lamb Lies Down on Broadway, and tracks 1–2 of Extra Tracks'':
 Steve Hackett – guitars
 Phil Collins – drums, percussion, backing vocals, lead vocals on "For Absent Friends" and "More Fool Me," second lead vocal on "Harlequin" and "The Colony of Slippermen"

Formats
UK/EU Version:  CD/SACD hybrid + DVD (PAL)
US/Canadian Version: CD + DVD (NTSC)
Japanese Version:  CD/SACD hybrid + DVD (NTSC)

References

External links

Official Box set website

Genesis (band) compilation albums
Genesis (band) video albums
2008 compilation albums
Atlantic Records compilation albums
2008 live albums
2008 video albums
Live video albums
Genesis (band) live albums
Atlantic Records live albums
Atlantic Records video albums
EMI Records compilation albums
EMI Records live albums
EMI Records video albums
Rhino Records compilation albums
Rhino Records video albums